The Owensboro and Nashville Railway was a 19th- and early-20th-century railway company in western Kentucky in the United States. It operated from 1881, when it purchased the defunct Owensboro & Nashville and Tennessee & Kentucky railroads, until 1921, when it was purchased by the L&N. Its former rights-of-way currently form parts of the class-I CSX Transportation railway.

It connected with the Paducah and Elizabethtown and its successors (all subsequently part of the Illinois Central) at Central City in Muhlenberg County.

See also
 List of Kentucky railroads

Defunct Kentucky railroads
Defunct companies based in Kentucky